San Agustín is a village and rural municipality in Salta Province which is located in northwestern Argentina.

References

Populated places in Salta Province